Alice Washburn (1860–1929) was an American stage and film actress. She worked at the Edison, Vitagraph and Kalem studios. A historic aspect of her time in films has her appearing in some of the Edison sound shorts of 1913. Some have been preserved and demonstrated in recent years such as Jack's Joke where Washburn speaks. Her final film Snow White was her only known feature film. She died of heart attack in November 1929.

Selected filmography
Mr. Bumptious, Detective (1911)*short
Father's Dress Suit (1911)*short
Logan's Babies (1911)*short
The Bo'Sun's Watch (1911)*short
The Troubles of A. Butler (1911)*short
John Brown's Heir (1911)
Stage-Struck Lizzie (1911)*short
Uncle Hiram's List (1911)*short
The Two Flats (1912)*short
Freezing Auntie (1912)*short
Max and Maurice (1912)*short
Hogan's Alley (1912)*short
The Little Delicatessen Store (1912)*short
Her Polished Family (1912)*short
Percival Chubbs and the Widow (1912)*short
How Patrick's Eyes Were Opened (1912)*short
Aunt Miranda's Cat (1912)*short
Very Much Engaged (1912)*short
The Vision in the Window (1914)*short
Lo! The Poor Indian (1914)*short
Martha's Rebellion (1914)*short
The Voice of Silence (1914)*short
Mr. Jack Goes Into Business (1916)*short
Mr. Jack Hires a Stenographer (1916)*short
His Dukeship, Mr. Jack (1916)*short
Kernel Nutt, the Janitor (1916)*short
Kernel Nutt Wins a Wife (1916)*short
Kernel Nutt, the Footman (1916)*short
Kernel Nutt and the Hundred Dollar Bill (1916)*short
Kernel Nutt in Mexico (1916)*short
Kernel Nutt's Musical Shirt (1916)*short
Kernel Nutt Flirts with Wifie (1916)*short
Kernel Nutt and High Shoes (1916)*short
Snow White (1916)

References

External links
 
Alice Washburn IBDb.com
Alice Washburn center in a 1913 Edison talking comedy Jack's Joke

1860 births
1929 deaths
Actresses from Wisconsin
People from Oshkosh, Wisconsin